Jesus is a 1999 Italian-American biblical historical drama television miniseries that retells the historical events of Jesus Christ. It was shot in Morocco and Malta. It stars Jeremy Sisto as the titular character, Jacqueline Bisset as Mary of Nazareth, Debra Messing as Mary Magdalene and Gary Oldman as Pontius Pilate. The miniseries was broadcast in Italy in two parts on December 5 and 6, 1999 before being broadcast in the United States on May 14 and 15, 2000.

Overview
The film's chronology entails a cinematic blending of the Four Gospels with the addition of extra-biblical elements not found in the New Testament accounts. It provides a down to earth approach through its focus on the human aspect of Jesus. Compared to more solemn and divine portrayals in earlier films, Jesus expresses emotions weeping at Joseph's funeral, throwing stones in Lake Galilee upon meeting Simon Peter and James son of Zebedee, dancing at the wedding at Cana, and starting a water-splashing fight with his disciples.

While the film mainly presented familiar Christian Episodes, it provides extra-biblical scenes such as flashbacks of his first trip to Jerusalem with John as well as scenes of war and destruction waged in the name of Jesus during the medieval and modern times. Likewise, the film's Satan comes in two different forms: a visual exemplification of a modern man and a woman in red, instead of the traditional snake that can be found in most films. The film also adds a composite character, an apocryphal Roman historian named "Livio" who watches and comments as events unfold; he is presumably named after Livy. The film has been generally well received but it also been criticized for having an unrealistic Crucifixion scene as the person nailing Jesus to the cross is not a Roman Soldier but a Jew from the crowd. It has also been criticized for having a highly unsympathetic portrayal of Pontius Pilate, who appears to deliberately do everything to annoy the Jews, which is unlike most other media works in which he is usually depicted as an unwilling gentile participant dragged by the Sanhedrin into the unjust proceedings.
 
As it appears in the credits, it was dedicated in memory of Enrico Sabbatini.

Cast

 Jeremy Sisto as Jesus
 Jacqueline Bisset as Mary, mother of Jesus
 Armin Mueller-Stahl as Joseph the carpenter
 Debra Messing as Mary Magdalene
 David O'Hara as John the Baptist
 G. W. Bailey as Livio
 Luca Barbareschi as Herod Antipas 
 Christian Kohlund as Caiaphas
 Stefania Rocca as Mary of Bethany
 Luca Zingaretti as Simon Peter 
 Ian Duncan as John, son of Zebedee 
 Elena Sofia Ricci as Herodias 
 Gilly Gilchrist as Andrew 
 Thomas Lockyer as Judas Iscariot 
 Claudio Amendola as Barabbas
 Jeroen Krabbé as male Satan
 Gary Oldman as Pontius Pilate
 Gabriella Pession as Salome 
 Maria Cristina Heller as Martha 
 Manuela Ruggeri as female Satan 
 Peter Gevisser as Lazarus
 Fabio Sartor as James, son of Zebedee 
 Sebastian Knapp as Matthew
 Sean Harris as Thomas
 Karim Doukkali as Philip 
 Said Bey as Jude Thaddeus 
 Abedelouhahad Mouaddine as James, son of Alphaeus 
 El Housseine Dejjiti as Simon the Zealot
 Mohammed Taleb as Bartholomew
 Omar Lahlou as Nathanael 
 Roger Hammond as Joseph of Arimathea

Soundtrack

A soundtrack, Jesus: Music from and Inspired by the Epic Mini-Series, was released on March 8, 2000, for the series. "I Need You" was released as a single for the soundtrack by American country music recording artist LeAnn Rimes. "Spirit in the Sky" by dc Talk was also released as a B side with "I Need You".

See also
 TNT network's Bible Collection
 1999 in American television
 List of films shot in Malta
 List of foreign films shot in Morocco

References

External links
 
 
 

1999 films
1990s biographical films
1999 drama films
1999 television films
Bible Collection
Films about Jesus
CBS network films
Cultural depictions of John the Baptist
Cultural depictions of Judas Iscariot
Cultural depictions of Pontius Pilate
Das Erste original programming
Films directed by Roger Young
Films set in Jerusalem
Films shot in Malta
Films shot in Morocco
Portrayals of Jesus on television
Portrayals of the Virgin Mary in film
Portrayals of Saint Joseph in film
Portrayals of Mary Magdalene in film
Cultural depictions of Saint Peter